FC Nomads of Connah's Quay, also known as FC Nomads, is an association football club in Connah's Quay Flintshire, Wales. It was founded in 2009 when, during the 2008–09 season, stories started to circulate that Connah's Quay may lose its football team for the first time since 1890, and that they might merge with local rivals Flint. A group of long time supporters and local football experts set out to preserve football in Connah's Quay. In July 2019 the club announced that they had withdrawn from the league but had not folded.

History 
Connah's Quay F.C. was founded in 1890. Owing to concerns that Gap Connah's Quay Nomads were about to be dissolved, supporters of the club came together to form a phoenix club. They were placed in the Clwyd League Division two. Gap Connah's Quay Nomads complained about the new club to the Clywd League, accusing them of "hijacking" their name. FC Nomads responded saying it was "pettiness" after the league said there was nothing they could do as there was no rule on club names in the league's rulebook.

In their first two seasons, Nomads of Connah's Quay won both Division 1 and Division 2 unbeaten. They won a total of 55 league games in a row between 2009 and 2012 when they were beaten by Sychdyn. In 2013, they were promoted to Division 1 of the Welsh National League (Wrexham Area) (WNL) which they were promoted from. They won the WNL Premier Division in 2016. Normally this would have allowed them to enter the Cymru Alliance however the Football Association of Wales blocked their promotion on the grounds that their stadium did not meet league regulations. The club had agreed a groundshare with Airbus UK Broughton at their The Airfield stadium but the agreement came after the FAW's groundshare agreement deadline. In 2019, Nomads of Connah's Quay withdrew their first team from the WNL but kept the youth and veterans team running.

League history

Cup history
FC Nomads were knocked out of the Welsh Cup in the first round in 2015–16.

References

External links
Club website
Club twitter

Football clubs in Wales
2009 establishments in Wales
Welsh National League (Wrexham Area) Premier Division clubs
Clwyd East Football League clubs